Bunn is a surname. Notable people with the surname include:

Alfred Bunn (1796–1860), English theatrical manager
Bennie M. Bunn (1907–1943), American Marine officer killed in World War II
Beverly Atlee Bunn, birth name of American author Beverly Cleary
Fru T. Bunn, fictional character from Viz
George Bunn (disambiguation)
Jim Bunn (b. 1956), former U.S. Congressman from Oregon
John Bunn (basketball), American basketball coach
John Whitfield Bunn and Jacob Bunn, American financiers, industrialists, and friends of Abraham Lincoln
Leon Bunn (b. 1992), German professional boxer
Olivia Bunn (b. 1979), Australian equestrian
Romanzo Bunn, United States federal judge
Stan Bunn (b. 1946), American state legislator in Oregon
Tom Bunn, American state legislator in Oregon
William M. Bunn, American politician

See also
Bunn-O-Matic Corporation, Illinois-based manufacturer of coffee equipment founded by George R. Bunn Jr. and owner of the BUNN brand
Bunn, North Carolina
Justice Bunn (disambiguation)